Bahoutdin Architectural Complex is a complex in Bukhara, Uzbekistan.  Shaykh Baha-ud-Din or Bohoutdin was the founder of the Naqshbandi order, and was considered the spiritual patron of Bukhara governors; he died in 1389. That is why his necropolis, which was subsequently erected at his tomb, always was and remains the most esteemed in Uzbekistan and its fame has reached other Islamic countries. Ancient toponymy of this settlement is known under the name Kasri Arifon.

Site description
The architectural complex consists of several non-simultaneous constructions:

1. The most ancient is the dahma (gravestone) of Shaykh Baha-ud-Din Naqshband, riveted by marble blocks and enclosed above an openwork of marble lattice. The tomb of Shaykh Baha-ud-Din is located on the top platform, with the marble gravestone and stele. A small khauz (basin) is at the north, and riveted by the marble as well.

2. The site of the complex is Saho-khona, representing quadrangular pavilion of the type of rotunda. It is a construction with four arches, flanked on the corners by minaret-shaped turrets, which are capped by small domes.

3. At the complex, there is a mosque called Khakim Kushbegi, with the flat trabeation, supported by the two columns and forming six painted plafonds. To the south adjoins ayvan with five columns and the same number of painted plafonds. To the north is another ayvan, also with five wooden columns, beam ceiling and vassa.

4. The mosque of Muzaffarkhan is also a component of the complex, which has bricked walls. A flat-beam ceiling supported by the wooden columns and ayvan on the four columns with five various painted plafonds.

5. From the northern part of the mosque, the small minaret constructed from baked brick with lanterns from eight arched towers.

6. The complex has a small madrasah as well.

7. Abdul-Lazizkhan khonaqo is located in the northwest part of the courtyard. The composition of khonaqo was constructed in the classical method, using the square plan. The entrance into the complex was from two gates, named Toki-mionka, in the form of a small arched-dome construction, and Khodja Dilyavar gate.  In front of the main khonaqo facade is located the necropolis of Dahman-Shahon (a cemetery of governors). It represents 6 rectangular sufa with a height of up to 2,5 m, with the riveted walls from marble blocks. In addition, there are 2 wells and 2 khauz (basins).

History

World Heritage Status

This site was added to the UNESCO World Heritage Tentative List on 18/01/08, in the Cultural category.

Notes

References

Mausoleums in Uzbekistan
Mosques in Bukhara
World Heritage Sites in Uzbekistan